Sardinia is an unincorporated community in Clarendon County, South Carolina, United States. Sardinia has a post office with ZIP code 29143.

References

Unincorporated communities in Clarendon County, South Carolina
Unincorporated communities in South Carolina